Physical Review Applied is a monthly peer-reviewed, scientific journal covering applied physics. It is published by the American Physical Society and the editor-in-chief is Michael Thoennessen. The journal is part of the Physical Review family of journals.

According to the Journal Citation Reports, the journal has a 2021 impact factor of 4.931.

References

External links

American Physical Society academic journals
Physics journals
Monthly journals
Publications established in 2014